EVS Broadcast Equipment SA is a Belgian company that manufactures live outside broadcast digital video production systems. Their XT-VIA production video servers enable the creation, editing, exchange, and playout of audio and video feeds.

Tapeless television production
The programming of the television networks consists primarily of broadcasting prerecorded images, which, until very recently, were stored on tapes. But linear editing (or editing on tape) is being replaced by digital media or non-linear editing. Today, digital technology on hard disk (non-linear, by definition) is the common alternative. Television stations began migrating to tapeless interoperable computer platforms beginning in the late 1990s. Video tape recorders are rarely used nowadays for live productions.

Company history
EVS was co-founded in 1994 by Pierre Lhoest and Laurent Minguet. Three years later, the company invested  30% of its capital in private funds, roundabout EUR 4 million.

In 1998 EVS was listed for the first time on the stock exchange with an initial EUR 14.8 quotation per share (at comparable levels) and was valued at EUR 204 million. In that same year, EVS acquired VSE, a hardware subcontractor managed by Michel Counson. In that transaction, VSE received EVS shares for an approximate EUR 4.5 million value.

Since then, EVS has become a major broadcast actor, focusing on digital recording technologies for live sports TV production. EVS core products are primarily used in outbroadcasting vans (OB vans) and allow high-quality, respectively slow-motion image replay.

After establishing itself in outbroadcasting sports production, EVS started using  its high-value services to address TV studio production with a full range of products in 2002. That strategic move contributed to a +40% uplift in 2012. Additionally, EVS founded XDC in 2004, a pioneer in high-definition cinema broadcasting, which was restructured within the Dcinex Group. EVS sold its stake in Dcinex in 2014.

In 2001 Laurent Minguet stepped down from his position as a director. Three years later, he gave up his position.

From his side, Pierre L'hoest decided to leave his role as a CEO and director following the board of directors meeting held on September 15 of 2011. In a transitional period, EVS was managed by its board of directors. Later CEOs include Joop Janssen (2012–2014), Muriel De Lathouwer (2015–2018), and Serge Van Herck (2019–present).

On 5 January 2015 EVS announced that it had acquired Scalable Video System GmbH (SVS), which IT-based vision mixers, and Dyvi Live SA (a company based in Brussels and distributing the products of SVS under the name DYVI).

On 18 July 2018 EVS announces, through the press, the end of the collaboration with Muriel De Lathouwer, replaced ad interim by Pierre De Muelenaere, Chairman of the Board of Directors.

On 1 May 2020 EVS announced that it had acquired Axon, a leading broadcast and media network infrastructure specialist.

Products 
 Multicam (LSM): this is the controller software for the XT line of servers. Combined with its remote controller, it allows instant replays and slow-motion effects, widely used in sport broadcast.
 XS: this is the production server for studio environment.
 IPDirector : this is a software used to control the XT3 server offering several features as metadata management, rough cut editing and playlist management.
 Xedio: a modular application suite intended for broadcast professionals which handles the acquisition, production, media management and the playout of news. It includes a non-linear editing system, CleanEdit, which can work virtually.
 C-Cast: The tool delivers instant additional content to viewers on second screen media platforms.
 Epsio: The tool allows inserting graphics overlays in real-time or in instant replays.
 OpenCube family: MXF server that offers MXF file generation for streamlined tapeless workflows, XFReader (MXF reader) and XFConverter (MXF conversion).

Offices 
EVS headquarters (administration, production and development) are located in Liège in Belgium.
 
4 additional development centers are found in: 
 Toulouse (for OpenCube MXF products), 
 Paris (for Epsio),
 Brussels (for MediArchive Director).
 Darmstadt (for Dyvi)

References 

Companies based in Liège Province
Companies listed on Euronext Brussels
Cloud computing providers
Belgian companies established in 1994
1994 establishments in Belgium
Computer hardware companies
Software companies of Belgium